During the 1951–52 English football season, Brentford competed in the Football League Second Division. The Bees secured a third-consecutive top 10 finish and reached the fourth round of the FA Cup, taking Luton Town to two replays before being knocked out.

Season summary 
After two consecutive 9th-place finishes in the Second Division, Brentford manager Jackie Gibbons elected to keep his squad together for the 1951–52 season, with former Brighton & Hove Albion utility player Frank Morrad being his only first team signing.

Aided by the goalscoring of full back-cum-centre forward Fred Monk, Brentford showed excellent form in the first half of the season and just five losses in the opening 21 matches put the club into the promotion places. The push for promotion was derailed during the Christmas period, after consecutive defeats to Southampton on Christmas Day and Boxing Day. A dressing room ruckus ensued between manager Gibbons on one side and half backs Ron Greenwood and Jimmy Hill on the other. The bust-up resulted in Greenwood and Hill requesting transfers, with Hill eventually moving to local rivals Fulham in March 1952 in exchange for inside forward Jimmy Bowie.

Centre forward Billy Dare came into goalscoring in the second half of the season, but the disruption to the Harper-Hill-Greenwood half back line (Greenwood later rescinded his transfer request) led to an increase in the number of goals conceded and Brentford drifted out of contention for promotion to finish in 10th place. Amid much fanfare, former England international Tommy Lawton was signed for a club record £16,000 fee in March 1952, but he managed to contribute only two goals in his 10 appearances. In 2010, full back Ken Horne commented that "I'm sure we could have gone up that year but the spirit completely went out the team. We'd got by on spirit. The team had been kept together for so long that they had been fighting for each other".

The end of the season saw the retirement of Brentford's final two players signed prior to the outbreak of the Second World War in September 1939 – goalkeeper Ted Gaskell and utility man Tom Manley. Both received a joint-testimonial in April 1954.

League table

Results
Brentford's goal tally listed first.

Legend

Football League Second Division

FA Cup

 Sources: 100 Years Of Brentford, Statto, 11v11

Playing squad 
Players' ages are as of the opening day of the 1951–52 season.

 Sources: 100 Years Of Brentford, Timeless Bees

Coaching staff

Statistics

Appearances and goals

Players listed in italics left the club mid-season.
Source: 100 Years Of Brentford

Goalscorers 

Players listed in italics left the club mid-season.
Source: 100 Years Of Brentford

Amateur international caps

Management

Summary

Transfers & loans

Notes

References 

Brentford F.C. seasons
Brentford